Rosario is the largest city of the province of Santa Fe, and the third-largest city in Argentina.

Rosario (Spanish for "Rosary") may also refer to:

People
 Rosario (given name)
 Rosario (surname)

Places
 Rosario Municipality, Chihuahua, Mexico
 Rosario Municipality, Sinaloa, Mexico
 Rosario, Sonora, Mexico
 Rosario, Agusan del Sur, Philippines
 Rosario, Batangas, Philippines
 Rosario, Cavite, Philippines
 Rosario, La Union, Philippines
 Rosario, Northern Samar, Philippines
 Rosario, Santa Fe, Argentina
 Rosario, Uruguay, city
 Rosario de la Frontera, Salta Province, Argentina
 Rosário do Sul, Rio Grande do Sul, Brazil
 Puerto del Rosario, in the province of Las Palmas, Canary Islands
 Altos del Rosario, Bolívar Department, Colombia
 Rosario, Washington, a community in the United States
 Rosario Strait, a body of water in the San Juan Islands of Washington, US
 La Villa del Rosario, Venezuela
 Villa del Rosario, Paraguay

Other
 HMS Rosario, the name of seven ships of the Royal Navy
 Rosario (1935 film), a Mexican film from 1935
 Rosario (2010 film), a Filipino film
 Rosario (1969 TV series), Mexican telenovela
 Rosario (2013 TV series), American-Venezuelan telenovela
 Rosario Youth Club F.C., a Northern Irish football club
 Rosario (estate), the former estate of Seattle mayor and shipbuilder Robert Moran

See also 
 El Rosario (disambiguation)
 Rosary